Tuñón is a parish in Santo Adriano, a municipality within the province and autonomous community of Asturias, in northern Spain. 

The population is 76 (2006). The postal code is 33115.

This parish has several villages:
 Busecu
 Dosango
 La Casina
 La Collecha
 La Rodada
 La Veiga'l Rei
 Las Curuxas
 Les Carangues
 Peñoba
 Sabadía
 Tenebreo
 Tuñón

Feast days include:
 Feast of the Martyrs, dedicated to St. Fabian and St. Sebastian, 20 January
 San Antonio, 13 June

References 

Parishes in Santo Adriano